An Illyrian invasion of Molossians in Epirus occurred in 385 BC. Illyrians, led most likely by king Bardylis, were supported by Dionysius I of Syracuse who was aming to expand his influence in the eastern Adriatic Sea and Ionian Sea, and by Alcetas I of Epirus who was expelled from his land by the Molossian pro-Spartan party and exiled in Syracuse.

History 
In 385 BC, Alcetas of Epirus was a refugee in Syracuse for unknown reasons. Leader of Syracuse, Dionysius, wanted a friendly monarch in Epirus, so he sent 2,000 Greek hoplites and 500 suits of Greek armor to help the Illyrians, who at that time were led by king Bardyllis, to Molossians in Epirus. Attackers killed about 15,000 Molossian warriors. Alcetas was restored to  the throne, but Illyrians didn't stop there. They continued pillaging throughout Epirus and Greece. Dionysius joined them in an attempt to plunder the temple of Delphi. Then, Sparta, supported by Thessaly and Macedonians, intervened under Agesilaus, and expelled the Illyrians and Syracuse warriors.

See also 
Illyrian warfare

References

Bibliography 

Illyrians
Wars involving Sparta
385 BC
Wars involving Macedonia (ancient kingdom)
Wars involving Epirus
380s BC conflicts